The Mars Generation is a 2017 documentary film directed by Michael Barnett about aspiring teenage astronauts at Space Camp and mankind’s future journey to Mars.

The film premiered at the Sundance Film Festival in 2017 and was released by Netflix on May 5, 2017.

Premise 
Experts reflect on NASA's history and future, and provides an examination of what it will require to make the journey to Mars a reality.

Cast 
 Bob Behnken
 Zoe McElroy
 Alayna Bidlack
 Niko Blanks
 Charles F. Bolden Jr.
 Elsa Shiju
 Joseph Drew Carlton
 Alyssa Carson
 Colin Claytor
 Aurora Creamer
 Marisa Dimperio
 Jace Ezzell
 Bobak Ferdowsi
 Christopher Gorman
 Abigail Harrison
 Victoria Harrison
 John Holdren

Reception 
Josh Terry of the Deseret News gave it 3 out of 4 and wrote: "Does a good job of tapping into the inherent hope of exploring outer space and providing a realistic examination of what it will require."

References

External links
 
 
 

2017 documentary films
2017 films
American documentary films
Netflix original documentary films
Films about NASA
2010s English-language films
2010s American films
English-language Netflix original films